Somerset County Cricket Club are an English cricket club based in Taunton, Somerset. The club was founded in 1875 after a match between "Gentlemen of Somerset" and "Gentlemen of Devon" in Sidmouth, Devon. Somerset played their first undisputed first-class cricket match in 1882 against Lancashire. After missing the first season of the official County Championship, Somerset was admitted for the second in 1891, and have participated in the competition ever since. The club have played one-day cricket since its introduction to the English game in 1963, winning their first trophy in the 1979 Gillette Cup. All players who have played in 100 first-class or List A cricket matches are listed below. Only four players have made over 100 appearances in Twenty20 cricket for Somerset, James Hildreth currently holds the record for the most matches in the format for the club, having made 205 appearances.

Brian Langford holds the record for the greatest number of first-class appearances for Somerset. Between 1953 and 1974 the right-arm off break bowler played 504 times for the club. Only three other players have made more than 400 appearances for Somerset, and no-one has reached the milestone since Langford. Jack White, one of the three, is the club's leading wicket-taker in first-class cricket, claiming 2,165 dismissals for the county between 1909 and 1937. Harold Gimblett's tally of 21,142 first-class runs is the most by a Somerset cricketer, over 1,000 more than the next, Marcus Trescothick.

Englishmen Peter Denning and Graham Rose, jointly hold the record for most List A appearances for Somerset, while Marcus Trescothick holds the record for the most runs in one-day cricket for Somerset, with 7,374 from his twenty-one years with the county. Barbadian Hallam Moseley ranks as the top wicket-taker, claiming 309 wickets in one-day cricket, nine more than England Test cricketer Ian Botham.

Key
  denotes that player is still active for Somerset.
 Apps denotes the number of appearances the player has made for Somerset.
 Runs denotes the number of runs scored by the player for Somerset.
 Wkts denotes the number of wickets taken by the player for Somerset.
 Players are initially listed according to the date of their first-team debut for the club.
 Players in bold have appeared in either Test or One Day International matches for their country.

Players

References
General
 
 
Specific

Bibliography
 

100
Lists of English cricket records and statistics